The International Council for Children's Play (ICCP) is an international, non-governmental organization founded in Ulm, Germany in 1959, with a focus on the promotion of research, practice and policies focused in and around the area of play.

History 
ICCP was founded by a number of professors, early childhood educators and child development professionals from France, Germany and Switzerland. The organization now has members in 30 countries and is governed by a nine-member Board.

Affiliations 
ICCP is affiliated with The Association for the Study of Play, Alliance for Childhood, and the International Play Association.

Sources

External links 

 ICCP's web site

Play (activity)
Organizations established in 1959
Organisations based in Ulm
International organisations based in Germany
Child development organizations